Ernst Lüthi (born February 20, 1954) is a retired Swiss professional ice hockey defenceman who represented the Swiss national team at the 1976 Winter Olympics.

References

External links

Living people
Swiss ice hockey defencemen
1954 births
Ice hockey players at the 1976 Winter Olympics
Olympic ice hockey players of Switzerland